The following is a list of the monastic houses in Gloucestershire, England.

See also
 List of monastic houses in England
 List of monastic houses in Wales

Notes

References

Categpory:Medieval sites in England
Gloucestershire
 
Gloucestershire
Monastic houses